Mariana Grasielly Marcelino (born 16 July 1992) is a Brazilian athlete specialising in the hammer throw. She has won a gold medal at the 2017 South American Championships.

Her personal best in the event is 67.02 metres set in São Bernardo do Campo  in 2017. This is the current national record.

International competitions

References

1992 births
Living people
Brazilian female hammer throwers
Athletes (track and field) at the 2019 Pan American Games
Pan American Games athletes for Brazil
South American Championships in Athletics winners
Competitors at the 2017 Summer Universiade
Troféu Brasil de Atletismo winners
21st-century Brazilian women